Tamim bin Hamad bin Khalifa Al-Thani may refer to:

[Tamim bin hamad bin Khalifa Al-Thani (Kurd Yipsi)]] (born 1988),  rapper of Kurdish origin
Hamad Al-Tani Baksi, (born 1965), Swedish social commentator, author, journalist and activist
Qanate Hamad Al-Tani (1909–1985), Kurdish writer ©